KFRI may refer to:

 Kerala Forest Research Institute (KFRI), a research organisation based in Thrissur, Kerala, India
 KFRI (FM), a radio station (88.1 FM) licensed to Stanton, Texas, United States
 Kinmen Fisheries Research Institute, government agenvy in Kinmen, Taiwan
 the ICAO code for Marshall Army Airfield